Mr. Muhsin is a 1987 Turkish drama film, written and directed by Yavuz Turgul, featuring Şener Şen as a solitary middle-aged music producer, approached by a young man who dreams of becoming a folk singer. The film was screened in competition at the 24th Antalya Golden Orange Film Festival, where it won Golden Oranges for Best Film, Best Actor, Best Supporting Actor and Best Script, and the 6th International Istanbul Film Festival, where it won a Special Jury Prize, and was voted one of the 10 Best Turkish Films by the Ankara Cinema Association.

Plot
Ali Nazik seeks help from producer Muhsin Kanadikirik to become a Türkücü (a folk singer). Muhsin who is a fan of Müzeyyen Senar and Safiye Ayla is against the Arabesque type music that is favored by Nazik. Muhsin eventually relents and takes him under his wing and they work together to make Nazik a star.

Cast
Şener Şen (Muhsin Bey) 
Uğur Yücel (Ali Nazik)
Sermin Hürmeriç (Sevda) 
Osman Cavcı (Osman)
Erdoğan Sıcak (Şakir) 
Doğu Erkan (Madam) 
Erdinç Üstün (Laz Nurettin) 
Tayfun Çorağan (Sunucu) 
Kutay Köktürk (Dolandırıcı)

Awards
Muhsin Bey won Best Film, Best Actor (for Şener Şen), Best Supporting Actor (for Uğur Yücel) and Best Screenplay (for Yavuz Turgul) at the 24th Antalya Golden Orange Film Festival and the Special Jury Award at the İstanbul Film Festival.

References

Kampusteyiz.com Muhsin Bey Movie Stills

External links

1987 films
1980s musical comedy-drama films
1980s buddy comedy films
Films set in Turkey
Films shot in Turkey
Golden Orange Award for Best Film winners
Films scored by Attila Özdemiroğlu
Films about music and musicians
Turkish musical films
Turkish comedy-drama films
1987 drama films
1980s Turkish-language films